Margaret Wilson is an Australian former tennis player who was active in the 1930s.
 
Wilson won the mixed doubles title at the 1938 Australian Championships. Partnering with John Bromwich they defeated Nancye Wynne Bolton and Colin Long in the final  in straight sets. The next year, 1939, they again reached the final but were defeated in three sets by compatriot husband and wife team Nell Hall Hopman and Harry Hopman.

Grand Slam finals

Doubles (1 title, 1 runner-up)

References

Possibly living people
Australian female tennis players
Australian Championships (tennis) champions
Year of birth missing (living people)
Place of birth missing (living people)
Grand Slam (tennis) champions in girls' singles
Australian Championships (tennis) junior champions